The 2017 Desert Diamond Cup was the seventh edition of the preseason exhibition tournament. The competition featured six soccer teams from Major League Soccer, held from February 15 to February 25, 2017. The defending champion was the New England Revolution.

Teams 
The following clubs are confirmed entrants to the tournament:

New England Revolution (sixth appearance)
Sporting Kansas City (fourth appearance)
New York Red Bulls (fourth appearance)
Houston Dynamo (second appearance)
New York City FC
Colorado Rapids (fourth appearance)

Table standings

Tournament

Finals

References 

2017
2017 in American soccer
2017 in sports in Arizona
February 2017 sports events in the United States